The 1937 San Francisco State States football team represented San Francisco State College—now known as San Francisco State University—as an independent during the 1937 college football season. Led by third-year co-head coaches Dan Farmer and Hal Hardin, San Francisco State compiled a record of 1–6–1 and was outscored by its opponents 142 to 49. The team played home games at Roberts Field in San Francisco. Although the "Gator" was voted to be the mascot for the team in 1931, local newspaper articles called the team the "Staters" from 1935 through 1940.

Schedule

References

San Francisco State
San Francisco State Gators football seasons
San Francisco State Staters football